San Juan Bautista is a ward (barrio) of Madrid belonging to the district of Ciudad Lineal.

Wards of Madrid
Ciudad Lineal